Srđan Dimitrov (born 28 July 1992) is a Serbian footballer who plays for Okzhetpes.

Club career

Inđija
Born in Novi Sad, Dimitrov was recognized as a standout of Inđija's youth academy from early age. He made his professional debut at the age of 17 with Inđija on 3 October 2009 in a match against Radnički Niš. At the end of the 2011–12 season he was the third-highest goalscorer in the entire Serbian First League even though he was a teenager.

Napredak
In August 2013, Dimitrov was one of Napredak Kruševac's ambitious summer signings of 2013 which included the likes of Nikola Trujić and Miloš Deletić. Dimitrov immediately became a regular starter for Napredak. He scored his first goal for Napredak on 23 November 2013 in a 3–0 win against OFK Beograd.

Birkirkara
On 17 June 2016, Dimitrov signed a one-year contract at Maltese Premier League, club Birkirkara.

MTK
At the end of September 2020, Dimitrov moved to Hungarian club MTK Budapest FC.

References

External links

1992 births
Living people
Footballers from Novi Sad
Association football midfielders
Serbian footballers
FK Inđija players
FK Napredak Kruševac players
Birkirkara F.C. players
FK RFS players
Srđan Dimitrov
MTK Budapest FC players
Serbian First League players
Serbian SuperLiga players
Maltese Premier League players
Latvian Higher League players
Srđan Dimitrov
Nemzeti Bajnokság I players
Serbian expatriate footballers
Serbian expatriate sportspeople in Malta
Expatriate footballers in Malta
Serbian expatriate sportspeople in Latvia
Expatriate footballers in Latvia
Serbian expatriate sportspeople in Thailand
Expatriate footballers in Thailand
Serbian expatriate sportspeople in Hungary
Expatriate footballers in Hungary